Rungsted, also known as Rungsted Kyst is an affluent suburban neighborhood in Hørsholm Municipality on the Øresund coast north of Copenhagen, Denmark. The center of Hørsholm is located two kilometers west of Rungsted. At the Øresund coast is Rungsted Harbour, a marina.

History

The name Rungsted is first recorded in 1346 in the form Runæstigh. The name may be derived from Old Danish runi meaning  and sti''' 'svinesti', later changed to sted. Alternatively the first part of the name may refer to the small waves that are characteristic of the Øresund.

Rungsted's inn, Rungsted Kro, is first mentioned in the beginning of the 16th century but it is probably much older. The inn moved in 1803, and the buildings were renamed Rungstedlund.

Marina
Rungsted Marina has room for approximately 800 boats. It is home to many restaurants, including a MASH steakhouse and a Sticks'n'Sushi.

Sport
The neighborhood has many sports facilities and venues, and the ice hockey club Rungsted IK is housed in Rungsted Skøjtehal.

Transport
Rungsted also has a train station - Rungsted Kyst Station.

Notable residents 

 Louise Conring (1824–1891) a superintendent, hospital inspector, deaconess and nurse.
  (1845–95), writer, military officer, adventurer and father of Karen Blixen
 Dagmar Hansen (1871 –1959) a singer, stage-performer and Denmark's first "pin-up girl".
 Olivia Holm-Møller (1875–1970 in Rungsted) a Danish painter and sculptor
 Karen Blixen, (1885–1962) a distinguished Danish writer of Out of Africa Thomas Dinesen VC (1892–1979), Danish military officer in Canadian service and Victoria Cross recipient
 Simon Spies (1921–1984 in Rungsted) a Danish tycoon
 Dorete Bloch (1943-2015) a zoologist, wrote about animals and plants of the Faroe Islands.
 Frederik Fetterlein (born 1970) a retired Danish tennis player
 Christoffer Boe (born 1974) a Danish film director and screenwriter 
 Joachim B. Hansen (born 1990) a Danish professional golfer, lives in Rungsted
 Cecilie Wellemberg (born 1994) a Danish model and beauty pageant titleholder, Miss Universe Denmark 2015

Cultural references
 Johannes Ewald lived from March 1773 to autumn 1775 at the then Rungsted Inn, where he had some of his most productive years and wrote Rungsteds Lyksaligheder - En Ode''.

Further reading
 Rungsteds Lyksaligheder - En Ode (in Danish)

References

External links

Capital Region of Denmark
Neighbourhoods in Denmark
Hørsholm Municipality